Feulner is a German surname. Notable people with the surname include:

 Edwin Feulner (born 1941), American academic
 Markus Feulner (born 1982), German footballer

See also
 Fellner

German-language surnames